Gianfranco Frattini (May 15, 1926 – April 6, 2004) was an Italian architect and designer. He is a member of the generation that created the Italian design movement in the late 1950s through the 1960s and is considered to have played a major role in shaping it.

Early life and education
Gianfranco Frattini was born in Padua, Italy on May 15, 1926. He graduated with a degree in architecture from the Politecnico di Milano in 1953.

Work and career
Frattini opened his own professional practice in Milan, after having worked in the office of his teacher and mentor Giò Ponti. Frattini became an industrial designer by default when he lacked appropriate lighting and furniture for his interiors. His collaboration with Cesare Cassina for his namesake company started in 1954, followed by collaborations with many other manufacturers, such as Bernini, Arteluce, Acerbis, Fantoni, Artemide (for whom among others pieces with Livio Castiglioni he designed the historic Boalum lamp), Luci, Knoll, Lema and many others. In 1956 he co-founded Associazione per il Disegno Industriale and throughout his career he practiced both industrial design and architecture, focusing mostly on interiors. His residential commissions included numerous private apartments and palazzos, stores, and offices.

His international commissions took him to Dusseldorf and Luxembourg, where he designed the interiors of the luxury stores, and Tokyo, where he designed the interior public spaces of the Tokyo Hilton. 

Frattini was a board member of the Triennale. A great connoisseur of wood craftsmanship, he forged a long and fruitful professional partnership with the master craftsman from Bovisio Masciago (Milan), Pierluigi Ghianda. Glassware designed by Gianfranco Frattini for Progetti is in the permanent collection of the Museum of Modern Art and the Boalum lamp (with Livio Castiglioni) produced by Artemide is in the collection of the Smithsonian, Cooper-Hewitt National Design Museum.

Gallery of works

Death and afterward
Gianfranco Frattini died in Milan, Italy on April 6, 2004.

Awards and honors
Frattini won many professional awards and prizes, among them the prestigious Compasso d'Oro.

References

External links
 Gianfranco Frattini Archivio (Official Website)

1926 births
2004 deaths
Polytechnic University of Milan alumni
Architects from Milan
Italian industrial designers